Henrique Portela, was a Portuguese footballer who played as a midfielder.

International career 

Portela gained 2 caps for Portugal and made his debut 17 December 1922 in Lisbon against Spain, in a 1-2 defeat.

External links 
 

Portuguese footballers
Association football midfielders
Sporting CP footballers
Portugal international footballers
Year of death missing
Year of birth missing
Footballers from Lisbon